Rita Abatzi (also spelled Abadzi) (1914 – 17 June 1969) was a Greek rebetiko musician who began her career in the first part of the 1930s.

She was born in Smyrna (now Izmir), in the Aidin Vilayet of the Ottoman Empire. Some sources have given her year of birth as 1903.

A singer of rebetiko, Smyrneika, and other music, she was a popular performer on gramophone records in the 1930s. During that decade, the only female singer of rebetiko who rivalled her in popularity, and in the number of her recordings, was Roza Eskenazi.

Abatzi performed with many of the most famous musicians including Kostas Skarvelis, Spyros Peristeris, Dimitrios Semsis, Markos Vamvakaris and Vassilis Tsitsanis. Her career ended after World War II.

She died in Egaleo (Athens). Her sister, Sofia Karivali, was also a notable singer of rebetiko.

Discography
Two collections dedicated to Rita Abatzi's recordings have been issued:
Rita Abatzi 1933–1938, Heritage
Rita Abatzi, Minos-Arkheio

Her recordings also appear on these anthologies:  
  Women of Rembetika, JSP/Amazon
  Women of Rembetika 1908-1947, 4-CD collection, JSP/Amazon

References

External links
 Rita Abatzi (Ρίτα Αμπατζή) recordings at the Discography of American Historical Recordings.

1969 deaths
Emigrants from the Ottoman Empire to Greece
Musicians from İzmir
People from Aidin vilayet
Smyrniote Greeks
Greek rebetiko singers
20th-century Greek women singers
20th-century births